Vanevskaya is a rural locality (a village) in Spasskoye Rural Settlement, Tarnogsky District, Vologda Oblast, Russia. The population was 20 as of 2002.

Geography 
Vanevskaya is located 46 km northwest of Tarnogsky Gorodok (the district's administrative centre) by road. Shelovskaya is the nearest rural locality.

References 

Rural localities in Tarnogsky District